The orange-breasted laughingthrush (Garrulax annamensis) is a passerine bird in the family Leiothrichidae. Until recently it was regarded as a subspecies of the spot-breasted laughingthrush (S. merulina) but has now been split as a separate species. The two have traditionally been placed in the genus Garrulax.

It is a medium-sized bird with a strong bill and legs and a fairly long tail. It is 24–25 cm long with a bill length of 25–27 mm, a wing length of 83–92 mm and a tail length of 88–100 mm. It is mostly plain brown apart from an orange stripe over the eye, a black throat and an orange breast with black streaks. It has a loud, melodious song. The spot-breasted laughingthrush is similar but has a pale throat and breast with dark spots and a pale stripe above the eye.

It is endemic to Vietnam where it occurs in the Da Lat Plateau in southern Annam. It inhabits montane forest between 915 and 1510 m above sea-level and can survive in degraded habitats such as secondary forest and cultivated land close to forested areas. It is most often seen in pairs. Although it only has a small range, it appears to be tolerant of habitat degradation and is classed as Least Concern by BirdLife International.

References

 BirdLife International (2008) Species factsheet: Garrulax annamensis. Retrieved 31 October 2008.
 Collar, N. J. (2006) A partial revision of the Asian babblers (Timaliidae), Forktail, 22: 85-112.
 Robson, Craig (2002) A Field Guide to the Birds of South-east Asia, New Holland, London.

External links
 Oriental Bird Images: orange-breasted laughingthrush
 Xenocanto: orange-breasted laughingthrush, recordings of song and call

Laughingthrushes
Garrulax
Birds of Vietnam
Endemic birds of Vietnam
Birds described in 1919